Market intelligence, MARKINT is an intelligence gathering discipline used by the United States Intelligence Community (IC) that focuses on intelligence gathered from the global capital markets. It is analogous to other “INTs” in the IC’s domain, such as SIGINT (signals intelligence), ELINT (electronic intelligence) of (signals Intelligence), MASINT (measurement and signature intelligence), IMINT (imagery intelligence) and HUMINT (human intelligence). It is complementary to but different from FININT (financial intelligence), in which information about the financial affairs of entities of interest is gathered.
 
Within the IC, MARKINT is defined as, “the systematic collection and analysis of confidential and open-source information from the global capital and commodities markets in order to derive actionable intelligence from the activities of market participants”.  
 
MARKINT is different from the traditional definition of Market Intelligence or Marketing Intelligence, in which information is gathered for purposes of enhancing commercial marketing efforts rather than for purposes of analysis relating to national security.

References

Intelligence gathering disciplines